Changshun County is a county of Guizhou, China. It is under the administration of the Qiannan Buyei and Miao Autonomous Prefecture.

Climate

References

County-level divisions of Guizhou
Qiannan Buyei and Miao Autonomous Prefecture